Khalaflu may refer to:
 Khalaflu, Ardabil
 Khalaflu, Ahar, East Azerbaijan Province
 Khalaflu, Meyaneh, East Azerbaijan Province
 Khalaflu, Zanjan